Bernacice Górne  is a village located in Poland, in the Opole Voivodeship, Głubczyce County and Gmina Głubczyce.

See also
 Bernacice

Villages in Głubczyce County